General elections were held in the Bahamas on 19 September 1972. The result was a victory for the Progressive Liberal Party, which won 57.9% of the vote and 29 of the 38 seats.

Results

Elected MPs

References

Bahamas
1972 in the Bahamas
Elections in the Bahamas
Bahamas
Election and referendum articles with incomplete results